The 1989–90 Houston Cougars men's basketball team represented the University of Houston as a member of the Southwest Conference during the 1989–90 NCAA men's basketball season. The head coach was Pat Foster, and the team played its home games at the Hofheinz Pavilion in Houston, Texas.

The Cougars played in the NCAA tournament for the first time in three seasons, and lost in the opening round to UC Santa Barbara, 70–66. Houston finished with a record of 25–8 (13–3 SWC).

Roster

Schedule and results

|-
!colspan=12 style=| Regular Season

|-
!colspan=12 style=| SWC Tournament

|-
!colspan=12 style=| NCAA Tournament

NBA draft

References

Houston Cougars men's basketball seasons
Houston
Houston
Houston
Houston